Progress 27 was a Soviet uncrewed Progress cargo spacecraft, which was launched in January 1987 to resupply the Mir space station.

Launch
Progress 27 launched on 16 January 1987 from the Baikonur Cosmodrome in the Kazakh SSR. It used a Soyuz-U2 rocket.

Docking
Progress 27 docked with the aft port of the Mir Core Module on 18 January 1987 at 07:26:50 UTC, and was undocked on 23 February 1987 at 11:29:01 UTC.

Decay
It remained in orbit until 25 February 1987, when it was deorbited. The deorbit burn occurred at 15:16:45 UTC and the mission ended at 16:05 UTC.

See also

 1987 in spaceflight
 List of Progress missions
 List of uncrewed spaceflights to Mir

References

Progress (spacecraft) missions
1987 in the Soviet Union
Spacecraft launched in 1987
Spacecraft which reentered in 1987
Spacecraft launched by Soyuz-U rockets